Oleg Shutov (born August 9, 1988) is a Ukrainian footballer.

Playing career 
Shutov began his career in 2006 in the Ukrainian First League with FC Stal Kamianske, where he featured in 217 matches and recorded 13 goals  In 2015, he played with NK Veres Rivne in the Ukrainian Second League, and helped the club achieve a promotion to the first league by finishing second in the standings. The following season he went overseas to Canada to sign with FC Ukraine United in the Canadian Soccer League. In his debut season he recorded three goals in 21 matches and assisted the club in securing a postseason berth by finishing second in the standings. He featured in the quarterfinal match against Brantford Galaxy and contributed by scoring a goal in a 3-0 victory. Their opponents in the next round were the Serbian White Eagles, but were eliminated from the playoffs by a 1-0 loss.[13]

In 2017, after the relegation of FC Ukraine to the Second Division he signed with FC Vorkuta. Throughout the season he assisted in securing the regular season title.

References 

1988 births
Living people
Sportspeople from Mariupol
Ukrainian footballers
FC Stal Kamianske players
NK Veres Rivne players
FC Ukraine United players
FC Continentals players
Canadian Soccer League (1998–present) players
Association football midfielders
Ukrainian First League players
Ukrainian expatriate footballers
Ukrainian expatriate sportspeople in Canada
Expatriate soccer players in Canada
Ukrainian Second League players
21st-century Ukrainian people